Češinovo is a village in the municipality of Češinovo-Obleševo, North Macedonia. It used to be a municipality of its own.

Demographics
According to the 2002 census, the village had a total of 998 inhabitants. Ethnic groups in the village include:

Macedonians 998

References

Villages in Češinovo-Obleševo Municipality